Zorro's Fighting Legion is a 1939 Republic Pictures film serial consisting of twelve chapters starring Reed Hadley as Zorro and directed by William Witney and John English. The plot revolves around his alter-ego Don Diego's fight against the evil Don Del Oro.

The serial is unusual in featuring a real historical personage, Mexican President Benito Juárez, as a minor character. It is the second in a series of five Zorro serials: Zorro Rides Again (1937), Zorro's Black Whip (1944), Son of Zorro (1947) and Ghost of Zorro (1949).

Plot
The mysterious Don Del Oro ("Lord of Gold"), an idol of the Yaqui, emerges and attacks the gold trade of the Republic of Mexico, intent on becoming Emperor. A man named Francisco is put in charge of a fighting legion to combat the Yaqui tribe and protect the gold; he is attacked by men working for Don Del Oro. Francisco's partner recognizes Zorro as the hidalgo Don Diego Vega. Francisco asks Diego, as Zorro, to take over the fighting legion and defeat Don Del Oro.

Cast
Reed Hadley as Don Diego Vega/Zorro 
Though there were numerous Zorro serials, Hadley was the only actor to play the original Zorro in any of them.
Sheila Darcy as Volita
William Corson as Ramón
Leander De Cordova as Governor Felipe
Edmund Cobb as Manuel González
John Merton as Comandante Manuel
C. Montague Shaw as Chief Justice Pablo/Don Del Oro 
Budd Buster as Juan
Carleton Young as Benito Juárez
Bud Geary as Don Del Oro (body and voice)

Production
Zorro's Fighting Legion was budgeted at $137,826, although the final negative cost was $144,419 (a $6,593, or 4.8%, overspend). It was filmed between 15 September and 14 October 1939 under the working title Return of Zorro. The serial's production number was 898.

This film was shot in Simi Hills and Chatsworth, Los Angeles.

Stunts
Dale Van Sickel doubling Reed Hadley
Yakima Canutt
James Fawcett 
Ted Mapes
Ken Terrell

Release

Theatrical
Zorro's Fighting Legions official release date is 16 December 1939, although this is actually the date the sixth chapter was made available to film exchanges. The serial was re-released on 24 March 1958, making it the last serial released by Republic, which re-released serials for several years following the release of their final serial King of the Carnival in 1955.

Television
In the early 1950s, Zorro's Fighting Legion was one of fourteen Republic serials edited into a television series. It was broadcast in six 26½-minute episodes.

Chapter titles

209 minutes = 3h, 28m, 58s

The Golden God (27 min 21s)
The Flaming "Z" (16 min 37s)
Descending Doom (16 min 40s)
The Bridge of Peril (16 min 42s)
The Decoy (16 min 38s)
Zorro to the Rescue (16 min 37s)
The Fugitive (16 min 23s)
Flowing Death (16 min 23s)
The Golden Arrow (16 min 36s) – Re-Cap Chapter
Mystery Wagon (16 min 37s)
Face to Face (16 min 20s)
Unmasked (16 min 34s)
Source:

Differences from the Zorro canon
The story takes a few liberties with Zorro's official timeline: it takes place in Mexico instead of Alta California; Zorro wears a masquerade mask, rather than the traditional bandana; the characters Don Alejandro Vega (Don Diego's father) and Bernardo are absent; and Zorro's horse, Tornado, was changed to white (much like Kaiketsu Zorro). However, this story is presented as a further adventure of Zorro, a sequel to the traditional "Mark of Zorro" origin story originally starring Douglas Fairbanks and Noah Beery Sr., which would be remade the year after Zorro's Fighting Legion with Tyrone Power and Basil Rathbone: Don Diego is said to be visiting from Los Angeles, and the serial intentionally did not remake the Zorro story; instead, it shows Zorro visiting Mexico because his help is needed there. The people of Mexico immediately recognize Zorro when he first appears, strongly suggesting that Zorro is a well-known hero.

The date given for the movie is 1824, which in and of itself establishes that it takes place well after Zorro's California adventures: Zorro opposed a corrupt Spanish Colonial government in his canon tales, and California ceased being a Spanish Colony in 1821.

References

External links

Stomp Tokyo Review of Zorro's Fighting Legion

Download or view online
Complete serial at The Internet Archive

Download through bittorrent in DX50 format

1939 films
1939 Western (genre) films
American Western (genre) films
American black-and-white films
1930s English-language films
Films directed by William Witney
Films directed by John English
Republic Pictures film serials
Zorro films
Films set in Mexico
Articles containing video clips
Films based on works by Johnston McCulley
1930s American films